James Monroe Buckley (December 16, 1836 – February 10, 1920) was a Methodist minister, doctor, author, and editor of the Christian Advocate.

Biography 

James Monroe Buckley was born in Rahway, New Jersey on December 16, 1836 to John Buckley and his wife Abby, but his father, also a Methodist Episcopal minister, died soon after he was born. Buckley became a Methodist Episcopal minister in 1858, preaching several churches in New Hampshire, Detroit, Brooklyn, and Stamford. He received education from Pennington Seminary and Wesleyan University, although he withdrew after a year for health reasons and continued with private instructors. He later received honorary degrees from Wesleyan, Emory and Henry College, and Syracuse University.

Buckley served as a delegate to the General Conferences of the Methodist Episcopal Church from 1872 to 1912; a delegate Ecumenical conferences in London (1881), Washington (1891), and Toronto (1911); and a member and later President of the Methodist Episcopal Church's Board of Foreign Missions. He was elected editor of the Christian Advocate, then known as the New York Christian Advocate, in 1880 and served for over 30 years. He also wrote a number of books. He was known as a formidable debater and writer and passionately argued for causes he believed in. "Dr. Buckley's editorial" in the Advocate was extremely influential, and it is said that many people would wait to see what he had to say on important matters before making up their own minds. According to one writer, he was "acclaimed the greatest debater in Methodism, if not in the nation." 

From 1872 to 1912, when he was a delegate in the General Conference, it was sometimes known as "Dr. Buckley in Session," and in one Conference he is said to have taken the floor seven hundred times.

Buckley advocated for what would eventually become the NewYork-Presbyterian Brooklyn Methodist Hospital in 1881 through his editorial work on the accidental death of an organist; and he served on its board for 35 years. Banker George I. Seney read his writing and was inspired to contribute land and assets worth over $410,000, and made building the hospital possible, which became the first Methodist hospital in the world. Buckley also served on various other organizational boards, including a number of other hospitals.

Buckley was vocal and influential in his opposition to women's rights, and was "one of the foremost opponents of both clergy and laity rights for women in the church" according to Jean Miller Schmidt. He fought against allowing Anna Oliver to preach, saying "I am opposed to inviting any woman to preach before this meeting. If the mother of our Lord were on earth, I should oppose her preaching here." He also wrote a book, The Wrong and Peril of Woman Suffrage, arguing against women's right to vote. He was known as "Captain of Conservatives" in the Methodist General Conference; and in 1888 he was part of the Committee on the Eligibility of Women, deciding whether or not women could be seated at the Conference, where he steered the committee to reject female delegates. Schmidt notes that it was not until Buckley died in 1920 that women were allowed licenses to preach in the Methodist Episcopal church by the General Conference. 

Buckley also debated publicly on the topic, including with Anna Howard Shaw, a fellow physician and the first ordained female Methodist minister, who had been ordained by the Methodist Protestant Church and was a leader of the women's suffrage movement.

Buckley was married three times, with all three of his marriages ending upon the deaths of his wives, Eliza Burns (m. 1864-1866), Sarah Staples (m. 1874-1883), and Adelaide Hill (m. 1886-1910). Buckley died in Morristown, New Jersey on February 10, 1920, at 83 years old. He was buried in Pine Hill Cemetery in Dover.

Selected works 

 Two weeks in the Yosemite Valley (1872)
 Christians and the theater (1875)
 Oats or Wild Oats (1885)
 The Land of the Czar and the Nihilist (1886)
 Faith-healing, Christian science and kindred phenomena (1892)
 Travels in three continents, Europe, Africa, Asia (1894)
 A history of Methodists in the United States (1896)
 The fundamentals and their contrasts (1906)
 The Wrong and peril of woman suffrage (1909)
 Theory and practice of foreign missions (1911)
 Constitutional and parliamentary history of the Methodist Episcopal church (1912)

References

Further reading 

 
 

1836 births
1920 deaths
19th-century American Methodist ministers
American magazine editors
The Pennington School alumni
Methodists from New Jersey
People from Rahway, New Jersey
Anti-suffragists